Sathanur is a village located near Magadi in Ramanagara district of Karnataka, India. It was the birthplace of musician/composer Pandareeka Vittala.

There is a high school started by Sri Narasimha Sastry in 1972, which caters to students from the surrounding villages. In 2007, an industrial training institution was started by SNR Education Trust for the rural students.

References

Villages in Ramanagara district